Lambda Theta Nu is a Latina-based Greek letter intercollegiate sorority founded in 1986 at California State University, Chico.

History

Formation 

The sorority explains that the Founders surpassed the status quo for Latinas of the day by attending college; finding strength in numbers they realized that by coming together they could create a support system of helpful, friendly faces and hone a united voice to be heard, respected and recognized on its merits.

Founding Mothers 

Early advocacy for the advancement of Latino and other minority communities remains a central part of the motivation of the sorority.

Purpose 
The purpose of Lambda Theta Nu Sorority, Inc. was set forth at its founding. "[Our purpose] shall be to open doors of opportunity to the Latinas in our community. The primary focus is academic excellence and meeting the needs of Latina women in higher education. Lambda Theta Nu Sorority, Inc. also promotes the advancement of Latinas through various campus activities and community services, and provides an environment for personal growth within a unit of sisterhood. Lambda Theta Nu Sorority Inc.'s priorities, however, will be placed on academic excellence and community service."

Ongoing growth 
Lambda Theta Nu has established 44 chapters since it began. Members are chosen on the basis of academic achievement (a 2.6 GPA is required to remain a member in good standing, and academic workshops are required by each chapter.) Along with academics, philanthropy and service are woven into its programming.

Perhaps surprising, and in a nod to the organizations' Hispanic roots, Lambda Theta Nu members regularly perform step dances with machetes to symbolize their culture and the strength of Latina Women. "Strolling" or "Party Walking is another widely enjoyed event, performed in unison to rhythmic beats; the sorority competes for the best step and stroll performances in nationally competition. The sorority explains it was first introduced to step dancing by Delta Sigma Theta, an historically African-American sorority, in 1987.

The sorority maintains a national alumnae association, the National Association of Lambda Alumnae.

In 1998 the sorority was a founding member of the National Association of Latino Fraternal Organizations (NALFO).

Philanthropy 
The sorority's Tijeras National Community Service Program has been a focus of philanthropy since Lambda Theta Nu was formed. Tijeras addresses the Latino communities educational needs by focusing in the areas of Latino leadership and Latino literacy.  The National community service program has two components, academic excellence and community service represented by Latina Youth Leadership Conference and Latino Literacy Fund.

Lambda Scholarship 
One of the main goals of Lambda Theta Nu Sorority, Inc. is to encourage and assist Latinas in the advancement of higher education, dedication to community service, and to provide an environment for personal growth within a unit of sisterhood. The organization does not only focus on its active members, but in the overall Latino community. In order to further their interest in helping out the Latino community, as a national organization Lambda Theta Nu Sorority Inc., has established a National Latina Scholarship Fund. The scholarship is designed with the goal of assisting young high school women pursue their own educational goals. Annually, every chapter awards a scholarship to applicants in their respective community.

In 2020 the sorority announced it was offering $40,000 in scholarship grants to support ten Latina applicants, regardless of membership status in the sorority.

Chapters 
Chapters of Lambda Theta Nu include:
Alpha - California State University, Chico March 11, 1986
Beta - Colorado State University, Fort Collins October 27, 1990
Gamma - California State University, Fresno December 9, 1990
Delta - University of California, Berkeley April 6, 1991
Epsilon - University of California, Davis December 5, 1992
Zeta - California State University, Sacramento April 22, 1994
Eta - Metropolitan State College, Denver October 22, 1994
Theta - California State University, Northridge January 23, 1995
Iota - University of California, Los Angeles September 22, 1996
Kappa - University of Northern Colorado, Greeley April 19, 1997
Lambda - Reserved for the deceased
Mu - University of California, Riverside November 22, 1998
Nu - University of California, Santa Barbara September 26, 1999
Xi - University of California, San Diego September 23, 2000
Omicron - University of Nebraska, Omaha November 18, 2000
Pi - California State University, Los Angeles November 18, 2000
Rho - Our Lady of the Lake University December 19, 2000
Sigma - University of California, Irvine April 1, 2001
Tau - University of Southern California November 10, 2001
Upsilon - Sonoma State University November 3, 2002
Phi - University of Texas, El Paso March 22, 2003
Chi - Stanford University October 12, 2003
Psi - Creighton University December 6, 2003
Omega - California State University, Monterey Bay October 30, 2005
Alpha Beta - University of Nebraska at Kearney October 15, 2005
Alpha Gamma - University of Nebraska, Lincoln July 22, 2006
Alpha Delta - Loyola Marymount University September 23, 2006
Alpha Epsilon - Iowa State University April 14, 2007
Alpha Zeta - University of San Francisco June 21, 2007
Alpha Eta - San Francisco State University June 30, 2007
Alpha Theta - San Jose State University November 13, 2007
Alpha Iota - University of Nevada, Las Vegas March 14, 2008
Alpha Kappa- California State University, San Bernardino November 2, 2008
Alpha Lambda - Arizona State University March 28, 2009
Alpha Mu - Western Illinois University July 11, 2009
Alpha Nu - St. John's University, City College of New York July 11, 2009
Alpha Xi - Kansas State University  December 11, 2010
Alpha Omicron - Colorado State University, Pueblo  September 11, 2011
Alpha Pi - University of California, Merced January 22, 2012
Alpha Rho - California State University, Dominguez Hills April 7, 2012
Alpha Sigma - University of Colorado, Boulder June 22, 2013
Alpha Tau - California State University, East Bay July 29, 2014
Alpha Upsilon - University of Iowa November 23, 2014
Alpha Phi - California Polytechnic State University, San Luis Obispo December 13, 2014
Alpha Chi - Kent State University, Ohio January 11, 2015

References

Latino fraternities and sororities
1986 establishments in California
Student organizations established in 1986
National Association of Latino Fraternal Organizations
Student societies in the United States
Hispanic and Latino organizations
California State University, Chico